Uni is the name of several inhabited localities in Russia.

Urban localities
Uni, Kirov Oblast, an urban-type settlement in Uninsky District of Kirov Oblast

Rural localities
Uni, Khabarovsk Krai, a selo in Nanaysky District of Khabarovsk Krai